(born 15 January 1998) is a Japanese footballer who currently plays for FC Tucson in the USL League One.

Career
After graduating at Osaka Gakuin University, Shibata signed with Spanish Tercera División side Tarancón, and moving to CD La Granja in September 2018.

In 2019, Shibata signed with Montenegrin Third League side Ibar Rožaje, making 18 appearances in all competitions and scoring a single goal in the Montenegrin Cup.

2021 saw Shibata move to the United States, joining four-tier NISA side Michigan Stars. After two appearances, he moved to fellow NISA club Stumptown AC.

On 16 March 2022, Shibata signed with USL League One club FC Tucson. He made his debut on 2 April 2022, appearing as a 75th–minute substitute in a 4–0 loss to Richmond Kickers.

References

1998 births
Living people
Association football forwards
Expatriate footballers in Montenegro
Expatriate footballers in Spain
Expatriate soccer players in the United States
FK Ibar Rožaje players
Japanese footballers
Japanese expatriate footballers
Japanese expatriate sportspeople in Montenegro
Japanese expatriate sportspeople in Spain
Japanese expatriate sportspeople in the United States
Michigan Stars FC players
National Independent Soccer Association players
Stumptown AC players
Tercera División players
FC Tucson players
USL League One players